Uncial 0162 (in the Gregory-Aland numbering), ε 023 (Soden; also known as Papyrus Oxyrhynchus 847 or P.Oxy. 847), is one vellum leaf of a Codex containing The Gospel of John in Greek. It has been paleographically assigned a 3rd or 4th century CE date.

Description 

Uncial 0162 is one of the manuscripts excavated by Bernard Pyne Grenfell and Arthur Surridge Hunt in Oxyrynchus, Egypt and is now part of the Metropolitan Museum of Art collection in New York City.

Unical 0162 measures 16 cm by 15 cm from a page of 20 lines.

The scribe of Uncial 0162 was probably a professional.

Uncial 0162 had formally been assigned to the 4th century CE, but Comfort argued that the small omicron belongs to the 3rd rather than the 4th century CE.

The readings of Uncial 0162 are very close to Papyrus 66 (P66), Papyrus 75 (P75) and Codex Vaticanus (B).

The text of Uncial 0162 is closer to Vaticanus than Sinaiticus.

Uncial 0162 is classed as a "consistently cited witness of the first order" in the Novum Testamentum Graece. NA27 considers it even more highly than other witnesses of this type. It provides an exclamation mark (!) for "papyri and uncial manuscripts of particular significance because of their age."

The text was first published by Grenfell and Hunt in The Oxyrhynchus Papyri in 1908.

Currently Uncial 0162 is dated by the INTF to the 4th century CE.

See also
 List of New Testament uncials
Other early uncials:
Uncial 0171
Uncial 0189
Uncial 0220
 Papyrus Oxyrhynchus 846
 Papyrus Oxyrhynchus 848

Related articles:
Textual criticism

References

Further reading 
 J. M. Bover, Dos papiros egipcios del N.T. recientemente publicados, EE 9 (1930), pp. 291–320. 
 B. P. Grenfell & A. S. Hunt, Oxyrhynchus Papyri VI, Egypt Exploration Fund (London 1908), pp. 4–5. 
 U. B. Schmid, D. C. Parker, W. J. Elliott, The Gospel according to St. John: The majuscules (Brill 2007), pp. 131–132. [text of the codex]

External links 

 P. Oxy. 847 – Oxyrhynchus Online
 Uncial 0162 at the Wieland Willker, "Textual Commentary"

Greek New Testament uncials
4th-century biblical manuscripts
Early Greek manuscripts of the New Testament
847
Manuscripts of the Metropolitan Museum of Art